Oregon Township is the name of two townships in Indiana:
Oregon Township, Clark County, Indiana
Oregon Township, Starke County, Indiana

Indiana township disambiguation pages